Pascale Martin (born 24 August 1961) is a French politician from La France Insoumise who has represented the Dordogne's 1st constituency in the National Assembly since 2022.

See also 

 List of deputies of the 16th National Assembly of France

References 

Living people
1961 births
Deputies of the 16th National Assembly of the French Fifth Republic
21st-century French politicians
21st-century French women politicians
Women members of the National Assembly (France)
Members of Parliament for Dordogne
People from Dieppe, Seine-Maritime
La France Insoumise politicians